The Renters and Housing Union (RAHU) is a syndicalist tenants union based in Australia.
RAHU organises for safe and secure housing through self-advocacy, education, and eviction defence.
This includes supporting tenants through processes like evictions and bond recovery, with the union recouping $12,000 in members' bond money in a year.

History 

The Renters and Housing Union was established in May 2020 as a response to increased housing precarity due to the COVID-19 pandemic.
The union was formed following a rent strike campaign organised by the Industrial Workers of the World branch in Melbourne.
During the COVID-19 pandemic in Victoria, RAHU campaigned for an eviction moratorium that was instated in Victoria for a period of time.
During the eviction moratorium, temporarily housed homeless people were evicted from hotel accommodation. This was opposed by RAHU.

In the union's first year, members dealt with a total of 84 cases involving 146 claims.
Of those cases, $126,775.20 of $139,947.16 in debt was resolved in favour of RAHU members by negotiating rent reductions, debt waivers, preventing rental increases, or claiming bonds.

Membership 
RAHU membership includes renters, homeowners and people in insecure housing.
Homeowners cannot vote.
Landlords, real estate agents, property managers, police officers, bailiffs, and sheriffs are not allowed to join the union.

Positions 
During the COVID-19 pandemic, RAHU campaigned for increased rental protections including an eviction moratorium.
RAHU advocates for expanding public housing as opposed to social housing.

References 

Trade unions in Australia
Housing rights organizations
Housing organizations
Affordable housing advocacy organizations
Syndicalist trade unions
2020 establishments in Australia